Alfred Young (27 November 1900 – 31 July 1975) was an English professional association football player of the 1920s.

Born in Wingate, County Durham, he played for local clubs Trimdon Grange and Wingate Albion before joining  Hartlepools United in 1923.  He made over 120 appearances for the club before he was transferred  to Gillingham in 1928. He made 18 Football League appearances for the Kent-based club during the 1928–29 season, but left at the end of the season to join Workington. Later in 1929 he joined Lincoln City and made 148 League appearances for the club, taking his total League appearances to 299. Nothing is known of his career after he left Sincil Bank.

References

1900 births
1975 deaths
English footballers
Gillingham F.C. players
Hartlepool United F.C. players
Lincoln City F.C. players
Workington A.F.C. players
People from Wingate, County Durham
Footballers from County Durham
Association football midfielders